Vitaly Kunin (born 2 October 1983) is a German chess player. He was awarded the title of Grandmaster (GM) by FIDE in 2006.

Chess career
He played in the Chess World Cup 2017, where he was defeated in the first round by Lê Quang Liêm.

References

External links 
 
 Vitaly Kunin chess games at 365Chess.com
 

1983 births
Living people
Chess grandmasters
German chess players